Aristotelia montarcella is a moth of the family Gelechiidae. It is found in Spain.

References

Moths described in 1941
Aristotelia (moth)
Moths of Europe